Roy Meyer (born 4 June 1991) is a Dutch judoka.

He competed at the 2016 Summer Olympics in Rio de Janeiro, in the men's +100 kg. In the quarter finals he was defeated by the eventual bronze medalist Or Sasson of Israel. In the repechage he was defeated by later bronze medalist Rafael Silva of Brazil. In the second round he eliminated Deo Gracia Ngokaba of Congo and in the third round he eliminated Kim Sung-Min of South Korea.

References

External links

 
 
 
 

1991 births
Living people
Dutch male judoka
Olympic judoka of the Netherlands
Judoka at the 2016 Summer Olympics
Judoka at the 2015 European Games
European Games competitors for the Netherlands
Sportspeople from Breda
Judoka at the 2019 European Games
20th-century Dutch people
21st-century Dutch people